Phil McKenzie (born 13 June 1963) is an Australian former professional rugby league footballer who played as a hooker in the 1980s and 1990s. 

He started his career in his home country, playing for Illawarra Steelers for two years before moving to England, where he played for Rochdale Hornets, Widnes and Workington Town.

Playing career

Representative career
Although born in Australia, McKenzie was eligible to play for Great Britain through his Scottish-born father. Despite making himself available for selection however, McKenzie never appeared for Great Britain.

County Cup Final appearances
Phil McKenzie played  in Widnes' 24-18 victory over Salford in the 1990 Lancashire County Cup Final during the 1990–91 season at Central Park, Wigan on Saturday 29 September 1990.

John Player Special Trophy Final appearances
Phil McKenzie played  in Widnes' 6-12 defeat by Wigan in the 1988–89 John Player Special Trophy Final during the 1988–89 season at Burnden Park, Bolton on Saturday 7 January 1989.

References

External links
Statistics at rugbyleagueproject.org

1963 births
Living people
Australian rugby league players
Australian expatriate sportspeople in England
Illawarra Steelers players
Rochdale Hornets players
Widnes Vikings players
Workington Town players
Rugby league hookers
Place of birth missing (living people)